The following are the association football events of the year 1979 throughout the world.

Events
Copa Libertadores 1979: Won by Olimpia Asunción after defeating Boca Juniors on an aggregate score of 2–0.
European Cup 1979: Won by Nottingham Forest after defeating Malmö FF 1–0 in the Final.
Intercontinental Cup 1979: Won by Olimpia Asunción after defeating Malmö FF by an aggregate score of 3–1. This was the last time the Intercontinental Cup was played in two legs (South America and Europe).
May 22 – Ruud Krol becomes Holland's most capped player in history when he plays his 65th match for the Netherlands national football team against Argentina.

Winners club national championship

Asia
: Al-Sadd SC

Europe
: K.S.K. Beveren
: PFC Levski Sofia
: Omonia Nicosia
: Esbjerg fB
: Liverpool F.C.
: RC Strasbourg
: AEK Athens
: Újpest FC
: AC Milan
:
Eredivisie – Ajax Amsterdam
Eerste Divisie – Excelsior Rotterdam
: Ruch Chorzów
: FC Porto
: Dundalk F.C.
: Celtic F.C.
: Real Madrid
: Trabzonspor 
: Hamburger SV
: FC Spartak Moscow

North and Central America
: Cruz Azul
 / :
 Vancouver Whitecaps  (NASL)

Oceania
: Marconi Fairfield

South America

Metropolitano – River Plate
Nacional – River Plate
: Internacional
: América de Cali
: Olimpia Asunción

International tournaments
1979 British Home Championship (May 19 – May 26, 1979)

 Pan American Games in San Juan, Puerto Rico (July 2 – July 14, 1979)
 
 
 
 Copa América (July 10 – December 12, 1979)
 
 
  and 
 World Youth Championship (August 26 – September 7, 1979)

Births

 January 2 – Jonathan Greening, English footballer and coach
 January 4 – Shergo Biran, German footballer
 January 12 – Grzegorz Rasiak, Polish footballer
 January 15 – Martin Petrov, Bulgarian footballer
 January 26 – Maksym Kalynychenko, Ukrainian footballer
 February 2 – Daniel Bierofka, German footballer
 February 13 – Rafael Márquez, Mexican footballer
 February 19 – Steve Cherundolo, American footballer
 February 20 – Denis Fladung, former Russian professional footballer
 March 2 – Damien Duff, Irish footballer
 March 4 – Vyacheslav Malafeev, Russian footballer
 March 22 – Aldo Duscher, Argentine footballer
 April 5 – Timo Hildebrand, German footballer
 April 12 – Tobias Linderoth, Swedish footballer
 April 20 – Ludovic Magnin, Swiss footballer
 April 26 – Fereydoon Zandi, Iranian-German footballer
 May 19 
 Diego Forlán, Uruguayan footballer
 Andrea Pirlo, Italian footballer
 May 29 – Arne Friedrich, German footballer
 May 30 – Fabian Ernst, German footballer
 June 4 – Naohiro Takahara, Japanese footballer
 June 7 – Kevin Hofland, Dutch footballer
 June 19 – José Kleberson, Brazilian footballer
 July 14 – Sergei Ignashevich, Russian footballer
 July 26 – Paul Freier, German footballer
 August 7 – Pablo Salinas, Bolivian footballer
 August 12 – Júnior Izaguirre, Honduran footballer
 September 11
Eric Abidal, French footballer
Leon Cort, English footballer
David Pizarro, Chilean footballer
 September 13 – Julio de León, Honduran footballer
 September 15 – Dadash Kazikhanov, former Russian professional footballer
 September 25 – Richard Bangwe, Botswana footballer
 October 8 – Doyle Vaca, Bolivian footballer
 October 9 – Gonzalo Sorondo, Uruguayan footballer
 October 15 – Paul Robinson, English footballer
 October 18 – Jaroslav Drobny, Czech footballer
 October 23 – Simon Davies, Welsh footballer
 October 30 – Simone Berardi, Italian former footballer
 November 2 – Marián Čišovský, Slovak footballer (d. 2020)
 November 5 
 Patrick Owomoyela, German footballer
 David Suazo, Honduran footballer
 November 15 – Rowan Hendricks, South African footballer
 November 20 – Dmitri Bulykin, Russian footballer
 November 21 – Vincenzo Iaquinta, Italian footballer
 December 7 – Diego Bengolea, Bolivian footballer
 December 14
 Jean-Alain Boumsong, French footballer
 Michael Owen, English footballer
 December 20 – Ashley Cole, English footballer
 December 30 – Hernán Boyero, Argentine footballer

Deaths

February
 February 16 - Henk Steeman, Dutch midfielder, bronze medalist at the 1920 Summer Olympics. (85)

April
 April 18 – Pedro Arico Suárez, Argentine defender, runner up of the 1930 FIFA World Cup . (70)
 April 19 - August Sackenheim, German forward, capped 4 times for the Germany national football team. (73)
 April 22 – Amedeo Biavati, Italian midfielder, winner of the 1938 FIFA World Cup. (64)
 April 30 - Jaap Bulder, Dutch forward, bronze medalist at the 1920 Summer Olympics. (82)

July
 July 14 – Santos Urdinarán, Uruguayan striker, winner of the 1930 FIFA World Cup. (79)
 July 31 – José Della Torre, Argentine defender, runner up of the 1930 FIFA World Cup . (73)

August
 August 21 – Giuseppe Meazza, Italian striker, winner of the 1934 FIFA World Cup and 1938 FIFA World Cup, often seen as the best player of his era, and one of the greatest of all time. (68)

December
 December 12 - Hans Rohde, German defender, 25 times capped for the Germany national football team. (65)

Movies
Yesterday's Hero

References

 
Association football by year